Nalec is a municipality in the comarca of the Urgell in Catalonia, Spain. It is situated in the valley of the Corb in the south of the comarca.

Demography

References

 Panareda Clopés, Josep Maria; Rios Calvet, Jaume; Rabella Vives, Josep Maria (1989). Guia de Catalunya, Barcelona: Caixa de Catalunya.  (Spanish).  (Catalan).

External links
Official website 
 Government data pages 

Municipalities in Urgell
Populated places in Urgell